Lower Foster Lake is a lake in Saskatchewan, Canada.

See also
List of lakes of Saskatchewan

References
Statistics Canada
Anglersatlas.com

Lakes of Saskatchewan